Punam Reddy (born 25 June 1987) is an American former professional tennis player.

In 2005, her only WTA Tour main-draw appearance came at the Kolkata Open when she partnered with countrywoman Ragini Vimal in the doubles event. They lost in the first round to Sania Mirza and Virginia Ruano Pascual.

ITF Circuit finals

Singles: 1 (runner-up)

Doubles: 1 (runner-up)

References

External links
 
 

1987 births
Living people
Indian female tennis players